William Henry Gaston (October 25, 1840 – January 24, 1927) was a Dallas landowner and Confederate soldier.

Biography
William H. Gaston was born near Prairie Bluff, Alabama on October 25, 1840.

In 1868, he and Aaron C. Camp founded Gaston and Camp, the first banking house in the city of Dallas. On February 2, 1904, he founded the Gaston National Bank.

He died at his son's home in Dallas on January 24, 1927, and was buried at Greenwood Cemetery.

A middle school in the Dallas Independent School District bears Gaston's name.

References

1840 births
1927 deaths
People from Wilcox County, Alabama
People from Dallas
Confederate States Army soldiers
History of Dallas